Oyri is a village on the central west coast of the Faroese island Eysturoy in the Sunda municipality.

The 2005 population was 142. Its postal code is FO 450. The village is south of the Eysturoy-to-Streymoy bridge, and is home to a large fish processing plant.

The name Oyri is usually translated as a sandspit.

See also

 List of towns in the Faroe Islands

References

External links
Danish site with photographs of Oyri
Sunda municipality website in Faroese only

Populated places in the Faroe Islands